Fabrizio Nicolás Correa González (born 18 January 2001) is a Uruguayan professional footballer who plays as a goalkeeper for River Plate Montevideo.

Career
Correa is a youth academy graduate of River Plate Montevideo. He made his professional debut on 1 February 2021 in his club's 2–0 league win against Defensor Sporting. He is a current Uruguayan youth international.

Career statistics

References

External links
 

2001 births
Living people
Footballers from Montevideo
Association football goalkeepers
Uruguayan footballers
Uruguayan Primera División players
Club Atlético River Plate (Montevideo) players